This article attempts to list the oldest buildings in the state of New Hampshire in the United States of America, including the oldest houses in New Hampshire and any other surviving structures from the First Period.  Some dates are approximate and based on architectural studies and historical records, other dates are based on dendrochronology. All entries should include citation with reference to: architectural features; a report by an architectural historian; or dendrochronology; or else be denoted as estimates in the separate lower list.

Verified with dendrochronology or architectural survey

Unverified estimates

See also 
 List of the oldest buildings in the United States
 Timeline of architectural styles

Notes 

New Hampshire
Oldest buildings